Harischandra Khemraj (born 1944) is a writer from Guyana. He was born and grew up on a sugar estate in West Bank Demerara, where his parents were both sugar workers in the 1940s. He attended school in Guyana and Howard University in the United States. Upon his return to Guyana in the mid 70's, he worked as a payroll clerk, civil servant, bank statistician, a short order cook, a librarian, a telephone operator and a teacher in West Coast Demerara.

During the 1980s he catered to the desire of the villagers of Uitvlugt and nearby communities to read by running a paperback library at a time when books were almost impossible to obtain in Guyana.

He wrote for some years but submitted nothing until completing the manuscript of Cosmic Dance, passed on by Heinemann Caribbean to Peepal Tree Press on the grounds that it was too adult for their list.   Peepal Tree published it in 1994. Cosmic Dance won the 1994 Guyana Prize for Literature.

Haris Khemraj has three adult daughters whom all attended universities in the United States.  He currently lives in the US with wife and family.

References

External links
The Missionary by Harischandra Khemraj Kyk-Over-Al via University of Florida Digital Collections

1944 births
Guyanese writers
Guyanese emigrants to the United States
Howard University alumni
Living people